The Girl from Maxim's is a 1933 British musical comedy film directed by Alexander Korda and starring Frances Day, Leslie Henson, Lady Tree and Stanley Holloway. It was an adaptation of the 1899 play La Dame de chez Maxim by Georges Feydeau. A French-language version was filmed at the same time under the title La dame de chez Maxim's.

Plot
A doctor tries to pass off a singer as his wife in Paris in 1904.

Cast
 Leslie Henson as Doctor Petypon
 Frances Day as La Mome
 George Grossmith, Jr. as The General
 Lady Tree as Madame Petypon
 Stanley Holloway as Mongicourt
 Gertrude Musgrove as Clementine
 Evan Thomas as Corignon
 Desmond Jeans as Etienne
 Hugh Dempster as The Duke
 Eric Portman as Uncredited

Critical reception
TV Guide called it a "Dull British comedy."

References

External links
 
 
 

1933 films
1933 musical comedy films
British black-and-white films
British musical comedy films
British films based on plays
Films based on works by Georges Feydeau
Films set in the 1900s
Films set in Paris
Films directed by Alexander Korda
Films produced by Alexander Korda
British multilingual films
1933 multilingual films
1930s English-language films
1930s British films